Link Air Express was a cargo airline based in Peschiera Borromeo, Milan, Italy. It is an all-cargo airline operating domestic scheduled services. Its main base is Linate Airport, Milan.

History
The airline started operations in April 2006 and has 10 employees (at March 2007).

Destinations
Link Air Express operates services to the following destinations (at June 2007):
Milan
Cagliari
Catania
Baden, Germany

Fleet
The Link Air Express included the following aircraft at March 2007:
2 − ATR 42-300F

The first two ATR 42 aircraft were with the airline from 3 April 2006 and a third ATR 42 was expected in June 2006.

See also 
 List of defunct airlines of Italy

References

Defunct airlines of Italy
Defunct cargo airlines
Airlines established in 2006
Italian companies established in 2006